Cannon-Fodder is an unfinished novel by the French writer Louis-Ferdinand Céline. The largely autobiographical narrative is set before World War II, and roughly continues where Céline's 1936 novel Death on Credit ended. Much of the novel disappeared in 1944. Surviving fragments have been published from 1948 and onward, the main part in book form in 1949.

See also
 20th-century French literature

References
Notes

Bibliography
 

1949 novels
Novels by Louis-Ferdinand Céline
French autobiographical novels
Unfinished novels